Yankee Creek Airport , also known as Yankee Creek 2 Airport, is a privately owned public-use airport located one nautical mile (2 km) south of the central business district of Yankee Creek, in the Yukon-Koyukuk Census Area of the U.S. state of Alaska.

Facilities and aircraft 
The airport has one runway designated 13/31 with a gravel and dirt surface measuring 1,560 by 16 feet (475 x 5 m).

References

External links
 FAA Alaska airport diagram (GIF)
 Topographic map as of 1 July 1954 from USGS The National Map

Airports in the Yukon–Koyukuk Census Area, Alaska
Privately owned airports